Cheeta-eh, Ganda Lalake? is a 1991 fantasy comedy film written by Arthur Nicdao and co-directed by Nicdao and Tony Cruz. The film stars Rene Requiestas, Cristina Gonzales, Paquito Diaz, and Chichay, and shares Cheeta-eh's, Starzan's sidekick, point of view.

Plot
A war between Amazons and their rivals left so many casualties on both sides, Cheetae (Rene Requiestas) rescues a mortally wounded Amazon. The woman gives him a stone before dying. He tries to swallow it, transforming him into Cheetae Ganda Lalake in Amazon costume. As the Amazon's rivals try to find the last of their enemies, they fight Cheetae but in vain.

Cast
 Rene Requiestas as Narding / Cheeta-eh
 Cristina Gonzales as Xuzixa
 Paquito Diaz as Nardong Toothpick
 Chichay as Lola
 Noel 'Ungga' Ayala as Dinggoy / Ungga
 Toni Aracama as Suzette
 Sylvia Sanchez as Sheila
 Lola Rodriguez as Reyna ng Kadiliman
 Joaquin Fajardo as Buaya
 Vangie Labalan as Kampon ng Reyna ng Kadiliman
 Gigi Posadas as Aling Gigi
 Evelyn Vargas as Estrella

Reception

References

External links
 Cheeta-eh: Ganda lalake? at the Internet Movie Database

1991 films
1990s fantasy comedy films
1991 comedy films
Filipino-language films
Philippine fantasy comedy films
Regal Entertainment films
1990s Tagalog-language films